The Great Jewel Robber is a 1950 American drama film directed by Peter Godfrey and written by Borden Chase. The film stars David Brian, Marjorie Reynolds, John Archer, Jacqueline deWit, Perdita Chandler and Stanley Church. The film was released by Warner Bros. on July 15, 1950.

Plot

Gerard Dennis (David Brian) is a suave, controlling character. He supports himself by filching jewels in ingenious ways from their owners, often women whom he inveigles into his clutches by seducing them. Although he primarily relies on conniving and trickery, he is not above also resorting to violence when necessary to enable him to escape apprehension by the law. 

He pulls off a series of amazingly clever seductions, heists and escapes from the police. However, one of his conquests, whom he had married, helps the police catch him. He is sentenced to prison for some 25 years, when he will be 55 years old.

Cast 
David Brian as Gerard Graham Dennis
Marjorie Reynolds as Martha Rollins
John Archer as Police Detective Lou Sampter
Jacqueline deWit as Mrs. Arthur Vinson
Perdita Chandler as Peggy Arthur
Stanley Church as Stanley Church 
Alix Talton as Brenda Hall
Cleo Moore as Vivacious Blonde at Airport (uncredited)

References

External links 
 

1950 films
1950 crime drama films
American black-and-white films
American crime drama films
Films directed by Peter Godfrey
Films scored by William Lava
Films set in Los Angeles
Films set in New York (state)
Films set in New York City
Warner Bros. films
1950s English-language films
1950s American films